Elachista habrella is a moth of the family Elachistidae. It is found along the eastern coast of New South Wales and Queensland.

The forewings of the males are metallic blue basally with shiny dark bronzy brown scales distally. Females have similar forewings but have three bluish white markings. The hindwings of both sexes are dark grey.

The larvae feed on Oplismenus aemulus. They mine the leaves of their host plant.

References

Moths described in 2011
Endemic fauna of Australia
habrella
Moths of Australia
Taxa named by Lauri Kaila